The 2014 Open de Nice Côte d'Azur was a men's tennis tournament played on outdoor clay courts. It was the 30th edition of the Open de Nice Côte d'Azur and was part of the ATP World Tour 250 series of the 2014 ATP World Tour. It took place at the Nice Lawn Tennis Club in Nice, France, from 18 May until 24 May 2014. Second-seeded Ernests Gulbis won the singles title.

Points and prize money

Point distribution

Prize money 

* per team

Singles main-draw entrants

Seeds 

 Rankings are as of May 12, 2014.

Other entrants 
The following players received wildcards into the singles main draw:
  Borna Ćorić
  Gaël Monfils
  Dominic Thiem

The following players received entry from the qualifying draw:
  Leonardo Mayer
  Lucas Pouille
  Jack Sock
  Martin Vaïsse

The following player received entry as a lucky loser:
  Sam Querrey

Withdrawals 
Before the tournament
  Guillermo García López
  Andrey Golubev
  Gaël Monfils
  Benoît Paire
  Vasek Pospisil
  Milos Raonic

Doubles main-draw entrants

Seeds 

 Rankings are as of May 12, 2014.

Other entrants 
The following pairs received wildcards into the doubles main draw:
  Somdev Devvarman /  Purav Raja
  Lee Hsin-han /  Wang Chieh-fu

Finals

Singles 

 Ernests Gulbis defeated  Federico Delbonis, 6–1, 7–6(7–5)

Doubles 

 Martin Kližan /  Philipp Oswald defeated  Rohan Bopanna /  Aisam-ul-Haq Qureshi, 6–2, 6–0

References

External links 
 Official website